Sisal (Agave sisalana) is a species of flowering plant native to southern Mexico, but widely cultivated and naturalized in many other countries. It yields a stiff fibre used in making rope and various other products. The term sisal may refer either to the plant's common name or the fibre, depending on the context. The sisal fibre is traditionally used for rope and twine, and has many other uses, including paper, cloth, footwear, hats, bags, carpets, geotextiles, and dartboards. It is also used as fibre reinforcements for composite fibreglass, rubber, and concrete products.

Taxonomy
The native origin of Agave sisalana is uncertain. Traditionally, it was deemed to be a native of the Yucatán Peninsula, but no records exist of botanical collections from there. They were originally shipped from the Spanish colonial port of Sisal in Yucatán (thus the name). The Yucatán plantations now cultivate henequen (Agave fourcroydes).

H.S. Gentry hypothesized a Chiapas origin, on the strength of traditional local usage. Evidence of an indigenous cottage industry there suggests it as the original habitat location, possibly as a cross of Agave angustifolia and Agave kewensis. The species is now naturalized in other parts of Mexico, as well as in Spain, Libya, Morocco, the Canary Islands, Cape Verde, many parts of Africa, Madagascar, Réunion, Seychelles, China, the Ryukyu Islands, India, Pakistan, Nepal, Burma, Cambodia, Thailand, the Solomon Islands, Queensland, Polynesia, Micronesia, Fiji, Hawaii, Florida, Central America, Ecuador, and the West Indies.

Plant description
Young leaves may have a few minute teeth along their margins, but lose them as they mature.

The sisal plant has a 7- to 10-year lifespan and typically produces 200–250 commercially usable leaves.  Each leaf contains around 1000 fibres.  The fibres account for only about 4% of the plant by weight. Sisal is considered a plant of the tropics and subtropics, since production benefits from temperatures above  and sunshine.

Cultivation
Sisal was used by the Aztecs and the Mayans to make fabrics and paper.

In the 19th century, sisal cultivation spread to Florida, the Caribbean islands, and Brazil (Paraiba and Bahia), as well as to countries in Africa, notably Tanzania and Kenya, and Asia. Sisal reportedly "came to Africa from Florida, through the mechanism of a remarkable German botanist, by the name of Hindorf."

In Cuba, its cultivation was introduced in 1880, by Fernando Heydrich in Matanzas.

The first commercial plantings in Brazil were made in the late 1930s, and the first sisal fibre exports from there were made in 1948.   Brazilian production did not accelerate until the 1960s, and the first of many spinning mills was established.  Today, Brazil is the major world producer of sisal. Both positive and negative environmental impacts arise from sisal growing.

Propagation
Propagation of sisal is generally by using bulbils produced from buds in the flower stalk or by suckers growing around the base of the plant, which are grown in nursery fields until large enough to be transplanted to their final positions. These methods offer no potential for genetic improvement. In vitro multiplication of selected genetic material using meristematic tissue culture offers considerable potential for the development of improved genetic material.

Fibre extraction
Fibre is extracted by a process known as decortication, where leaves are crushed, beaten, and brushed away by a rotating wheel set with blunt knives, so that only fibres remain. Alternatively, in East Africa, where production is typically on large estates, the leaves are transported to a central decortication plant, where water is used to wash away the waste parts of the leaves.

The fibre is then dried, brushed, and baled for export. Proper drying is important, as fibre quality depends largely on moisture content. Artificial drying has been found to result in generally better grades of fibre than sun drying, but is not always feasible in the less industrialised countries where sisal is produced. In the drier climate of north-east Brazil, sisal is mainly grown by smallholders and the fibre is extracted by teams using portable raspadors, which do not use water.

Fibre is subsequently cleaned by brushing. Dry fibres are machine combed and sorted into various grades, largely on the basis of the previous in-field separation of leaves into size groups.

Environmental impacts
Sisal farming initially caused environmental degradation, because sisal plantations replaced native forests, but is still considered less damaging than many types of farming.  No chemical fertilizers are used in sisal production, and although herbicides are occasionally used, even this impact may be eliminated, since most weeding is done by hand. The effluent from the decortication process causes serious pollution when it is allowed to flow into watercourses.

Sisal is considered to be an invasive species in Hawaii and Florida.

Uses
Traditionally, sisal has been the leading material for agricultural twine (binder twine and baler twine) because of its strength, durability, ability to stretch, affinity for certain dyestuffs, and resistance to deterioration in saltwater. The importance of this traditional use is diminishing with competition from polypropylene and the development of other haymaking techniques, while new higher-valued sisal products have been developed.

Apart from ropes, twines, and general cordage, sisal is used in low-cost and specialty paper, dartboards, buffing cloth, filters, geotextiles, mattresses, carpets, handicrafts, wire rope cores, and macramé. Sisal has been used as an environmentally friendly strengthening agent to replace asbestos and fibreglass in composite materials in various uses including the automobile industry. The lower-grade fibre is processed by the paper industry because of its high content of cellulose and hemicelluloses. The medium-grade fibre is used in the cordage industry for making ropes and baler and binder twine. Ropes and twines are widely employed for marine, agricultural, and general industrial use. The higher-grade fibre after treatment is converted into yarns and used by the carpet industry.

Other products developed from sisal fibre include spa products, cat-scratching posts, lumbar support belts, rugs, slippers, cloths, and disc buffers. Sisal wall covering meets the abrasion and tearing resistance standards of the American Society for Testing and Materials and of the National Fire Protection Association.

As extraction of fibre uses only a small percentage of the plant, some attempts to improve economic viability have focused on using the waste material for production of biogas, for stockfeed, or the extraction of pharmaceutical materials.

Sisal is a valuable forage for honeybees because of its long flowering period. It is particularly attractive to them during pollen shortage. The honey produced, however, is dark and has a strong and unpleasant flavour.

Because sisal is an agave, it can be fermented and distilled to make mezcal. In India, it may be an ingredient in some street snacks.

Carpets
Despite the yarn durability for which sisal is known, slight matting of sisal carpeting may occur in high-traffic areas. Sisal carpet does not build up static nor does it trap dust, so vacuuming is the only maintenance required. High-spill areas should be treated with a fibre sealer and for spot removal, a dry-cleaning powder is recommended. Depending on climatic conditions, sisal absorbs air humidity or releases it, causing expansion or contraction. Sisal is not recommended for areas that receive wet spills or rain or snow. Sisal is used by itself in carpets or in blends with wool and acrylic for a softer hand.

Global production and trade patterns 

Global production of sisal fibre in 2020 amounted to 210 thousand tonnes, of which Brazil, the largest producing country, produced 86,061 tonnes.

Tanzania produced about 36,379 tons, Kenya produced 22,768 tonnes, Madagascar 17,578 tonnes, and 14,006 tonnes were produced in China.  Mexico contributed 13,107 tons with smaller amounts coming from Haiti, Morocco, Venezuela, and South Africa. Sisal occupies sixth place among fibre plants, representing 2% of the world's production of plant fibre (plant fibres provide 65% of the world's fibre).

Heraldry
The sisal plant appears in the coat of arms of Barquisimeto, Venezuela.

An unofficial coat of arms for the Yucatán State in Mexico features a deer bounding over a sisal plant.

In literature 
Journalist John Gunther wrote of sisal in 1953, "if it had not been for the fact that sisal is a difficult crop, there might not have been a Munich in 1939. Neville Chamberlain started out life as a sisal planter in the Bahamas, and only returned to Britain and entered politics when he found that this obdurate vegetable was too hard to grow."

See also 
Fiber plants
Fiber rope
Henequen
International Year of Natural Fibres
Sisal production in Tanzania

References

Further reading
 G. W. Lock, Sisal – Longmans Green & Co., 1969.

External links

 
Agave
Fiber plants
Endemic flora of Mexico
Crops originating from Mexico
Non-food crops
Plants described in 1838
Flora naturalised in Australia
Introduced plants of South America